HCB may refer to:

 Hackbridge railway station, a railway station in South London
 Hampshire Cricket Board, the governing body for cricket in Hampshire, England
 Hamptons Collegiate Baseball, a summer baseball organization in New York State
 HCB (classification), a paralympic cycling classification
 HCB South Tyrol, an ice hockey club in Italy
 Henri Cartier-Bresson, a French photographer considered to be the father of modern photojournalism
 Hexachlorobenzene, a toxic fungicide formerly used as a seed treatment
 Homemade chemical bomb, an explosive device that can be made easily from volatile household chemicals
 Hydrocarbonoclastic bacteria, a form of oil biodegrader